Hypnale walli is a taxonomic synonym that may refer to:

 Hypnale hypnale, a.k.a. Merrem's hump-nosed viper, venomous pitviper found in Sri Lanka and southwestern India
 Hypnale walli, a.k.a. Wall's hump-nosed viper, venomous pitviper found in Sri Lanka